Edmund "Eddie" Szymala (24 June 1954), also known by the nickname of "Smiler", is an English former professional rugby league footballer who played in the 1970s and 1980s.

Background
Eddie Szymala's birth was registered in Barrow-in-Furness district, Lancashire, England.

Playing career

International honours
Eddie Szymala won a cap for England while at Barrow in 1979 against France (sub), and won caps for Great Britain while at Barrow in 1981 against France (sub), and France.

County Cup Final appearances
Eddie Szymala played right-, i.e. number 12, in Barrow's 12–8 victory over Widnes in the 1983 Lancashire County Cup Final during the 1983–84 season at Central Park, Wigan on Saturday 1 October 1983, the entire Barrow team was inducted into the Barrow Hall of Fame in 2003.

John Player Trophy Final appearances
Eddie Szymala played as an interchange/substitute, i.e. number 15, (replacing  Howard Allen) in Barrow's 5–12 defeat by Warrington in the 1980–81 John Player Trophy Final during the 1980–81 at Central Park, Wigan, on Saturday 24 January 1981.

Testimonial match
Derek Hadley, and Eddie Szymala shared a Testimonial match/Benefit season at Barrow during the 1983–84 Rugby Football League season.

Honoured at Barrow Raiders
David Cairns, and Eddie Szymala were both inducted into the Barrow Hall of Fame as individuals in 2010, having previously been inducted as part of 1983–84 Lancashire County Cup winning team in 2003.

References

External links
(archived by web.archive.org) Barrow RL's great Britons
(archived by web.archive.org) Cairns and Szymala set for Barrow RL Hall of Fame – again

1954 births
Living people
Barrow Raiders players
England national rugby league team players
English rugby league players
Great Britain national rugby league team players
Rugby league second-rows
Rugby league players from Barrow-in-Furness